The 1982 New Hampshire gubernatorial election took place on November 6, 1982.

Incumbent Democratic Governor Hugh Gallen ran for re-election but was defeated by Tufts University professor John Sununu. Sununu, who defeated Lou D'Allesandro for the Republican nomination, became the first Arab-American governor of New Hampshire.

Election results

References

See also

New Hampshire
1982
Gubernatorial